The 2012 Copa San Juan Gobierno was a professional tennis tournament played on clay courts. It was the first edition of the tournament which was part of the 2012 ATP Challenger Tour. It took place in San Juan, Argentina between 8 and 14 October 2012.

Singles main draw entrants

Seeds

 1 Rankings are as of October 1, 2012.

Other entrants
The following players received wildcards into the singles main draw:
  Facundo Alvo
  Diego Junqueira
  Renzo Olivo
  Diego Sebastián Schwartzman

The following players received entry as a special exempt into the singles main draw:
  Ricardo Hocevar
  Nicolas Massú

The following players received entry from the qualifying draw:
  Andrea Collarini
  Leandro Migani
  Stéphane Robert
  Thomas Schoorel

Champions

Singles

 Thiemo de Bakker def.  Martín Alund, 6–2, 3–6, 6–2

Doubles

 Martín Alund /  Horacio Zeballos def.  Nicholas Monroe /  Simon Stadler, 3–6, 6–2, [14–12]

External links
Official Website

Copa San Juan Gobierno
Copa San Juan Gobierno
Copa San Juan Gobierno
Copa San Juan Gobierno